Brief Heaven is a 1969 Argentine film directed by David José Kohon. It was entered into the 6th Moscow International Film Festival where Ana María Picchio won the award for Best Actress.

In a survey of the 100 greatest films of Argentine cinema carried out by the Museo del Cine Pablo Ducrós Hicken in 2000, the film reached the 24th position. In a new version of the survey organized in 2022 by the specialized magazines La vida útil, Taipei and La tierra quema, presented at the Mar del Plata International Film Festival, the film reached the 41st position.

Cast
 Alberto Fernández de Rosa
 Ana María Picchio
 Gloria Raines
 Zelmar Gueñol
 Beto Gianola
 David Llewelyn
 Marta Moreno
 Cristina Banegas
 Remedios Climent
 Carlos Antón
 Felipe Méndez

References

External links
 

1969 films
1969 drama films
1960s Spanish-language films
Films directed by David José Kohon
Argentine black-and-white films
Argentine drama films
1960s Argentine films